Listed below are the rosters for the eight teams participating in the 2004 World Cup of Hockey.

Canada
Players

Head Coach: Pat Quinn

Czech Republic
Players

Head Coach: Vladimír Růžička

Finland
Players

Head Coach: Raimo Summanen

Germany
Players

Head Coach: Franz Reindl

Russia
Players

Slovakia
Players

Sweden
Players

United States

See also
2004 World Cup of Hockey statistics

References

Rosters
World Cup of Hockey rosters